Little Lever School is a mixed secondary school located in Little Lever in the English county of Greater Manchester.

Little Lever school was previously a community school with a specialism in Business and Enterprise that was administered by Bolton Metropolitan Borough Council. However Little Lever School converted to academy status in December 2015 and is judged by Ofsted to 'require improvement' . The school offers GCSEs, BTECs and ASDAN courses as programmes of study for pupils.

Little Lever School coordinates with Bolton Metropolitan Borough Council for admissions, and the main feeder primary schools are Bowness Primary School, Masefield Primary School, Mytham Primary School, St Matthew's CE Primary School, St Stephen's & All Martyrs CE Primary School and St Teresa's RC Primary School.

References

External links
Little Lever School official website

Secondary schools in the Metropolitan Borough of Bolton
Academies in the Metropolitan Borough of Bolton